Southfork may refer to:
 Southfork, Gauteng, a suburb of Johannesburg, South Africa
 Southfork Ranch, Texas where the Dallas television series was filmed

See also
South Fork (disambiguation)